The black-bibbed monarch (Symposiachrus mundus) is a species of bird in the family Monarchidae that is endemic to Indonesia. It is found in the Tanimbar Islands. Its natural habitats are subtropical or tropical moist lowland forests and subtropical or tropical mangrove forests.

Taxonomy and systematics
This species was formerly placed in the genus Monarcha until moved to Symposiachrus in 2009. Alternate names include mundane monarch and Tanimbar monarch.

References

black-bibbed monarch
Birds of the Tanimbar Islands
black-bibbed monarch
black-bibbed monarch
Taxonomy articles created by Polbot